The 1898 South Norfolk by-election was a by-election held on 12 May 1898 for the British House of Commons constituency of South Norfolk.

The election was triggered by the resignation on grounds of ill-health of the sitting Liberal Unionist Party former Liberal  Member of Parliament (MP), Francis Taylor.

The result of the election was a clear win for Arthur Wellesley Soames the Liberal candidate over his Unionist opponent. Soames was a Liberal in the Radical tradition and he was described as a Radical during the election.

Result

References

The Times, 14 May 1898

1898 elections in the United Kingdom
1898 in England
19th century in Norfolk
South